Monhegan is an island in the Gulf of Maine. The population was 64 at the 2020 census. The plantation comprises its namesake island and the uninhabited neighboring island of Manana. The island is accessible by scheduled boat service from Boothbay Harbor, New Harbor and Port Clyde. Visitors' cars are not allowed on the island. It was designated a United States National Natural Landmark for its coastal and island flora in 1966.

History
The name Monhegan is a corruption of Monchiggon, the Abenaki language term for "out-to-sea island" used by Samoset, an Abenaki sagamore and the first Native American to make contact with the Pilgrims of Plymouth Colony, in his early contacts with the English. European explorers Martin Pring visited in 1603, Samuel de Champlain in 1604, George Weymouth in 1605 and Captain John Smith in 1614. The island got its start as a British fishing camp prior to settlement of the Plymouth Colony. Cod was harvested from the rich fishing grounds of the Gulf of Maine, then dried on fish flakes before shipment to Europe. A trading post was built to conduct business with the Indians, particularly in the lucrative fur trade. It was Monhegan traders who taught English to Samoset, the chieftain who in 1621 startled the Pilgrims by boldly walking into their new village at Plymouth and saying: "Welcome, Englishmen."

On April 29, 1717, Monhegan was visited by the Anne, a small square-rigged snow crewed by pirates. She had originally been captured off the Virginia Capes in April by the pirate Samuel Bellamy in the Whydah, which wrecked in a storm on the night of April 26, 1717, off Cape Cod.  The Anne made it through the storm with another captured vessel, the Fisher (which was soon abandoned and the pirates aboard her transferred to the Anne). The pirates, led by Richard Noland, arrived at Monhegan on April 29, and waited for the Whydah, for the pirates had not seen or heard about the Whydah wrecking in the storm of the night of April 26. The pirates eventually realized the Whydah was lost, and proceeded to attack vessels at Matinicus Island and Pemaquid (now Bristol). They outfitted  for their own uses a small 25-ton sloop belonging to Colonel Stephen Minot they had captured off Matinicus.  They abandoned all the other captured vessels (including the Anne) and most of their prisoners at Matinicus on or about May 9, 1717, on Minot's sloop.

Despite success as a fishing and trade center, Monhegan would be caught in the conflict between New England and New France for control of the region. During King Philip's War (1675-1678), dispossessed English settlers from the mainland sought refuge on the island before being relocated elsewhere along the coast. During King William's War (1688-1697), the island was captured for France in 1689 by Baron de Saint-Castin. He destroyed the fishing fleet and burned the buildings, with many inhabitants escaping to Massachusetts. But even during periods when Monhegan was abandoned, its convenient offshore harbor remained a stopover destination for ships. The end of the French and Indian War in 1763 brought peace to the area, and on September 4, 1839, Mohegan—again under English Colonial control—was incorporated as an island plantation.

In 1824, a conical stone lighthouse was built on the island by order of Congress and President James Monroe. Damaged by storms, it was replaced in 1850 by the present 48 foot (14.6 m) granite tower, with a fog bell station built in 1855 on nearby Manana Island. The island's  of good land encouraged agriculture, with potatoes the chief crop. But fishing was always the most important industry, whether locally or at the Grand Banks. Today, it still dominates Monhegan's economy.
From October 1 through June, fishermen harvest lobsters from the only lobster conservation area in the state of Maine.

Henry Trefethen was one of the original purchasers of Monhegan Island. The Trefethen House, the oldest house on Monhegan Island, served as a hotel for island visitors, and remains standing today.

Artist colony
The beginnings of the art colony on Monhegan date to the mid-19th century; by 1890, it was firmly established. Two of the early artists in residence from the 1890s, William Henry Singer (1868–1943) and Martin Borgord (1869–1935), left Monhegan to study at the Académie Julian in 1901. Among many early members who found inspiration on the island were summer visitors from the New York School of Art and the Pennsylvania Academy of the Fine Arts, such as Robert Henri, Frederick Judd Waugh, George Bellows, Edward Hopper and Rockwell Kent.

Later members of the artist colony have included Jay Hall Connaway, Abraham Bogdanove, Andrew Winter, Reuben Tam, Frances Kornbluth, Elena Jahn, Lynne Drexler, and Jamie Wyeth. The 150-foot (50 m) northside cliffs at Blackhead have drawn the interest of Monhegan artists, including Kent, Hopper, and Kornbluth.
The Monhegan Museum celebrated more the continuing draw of the island for artists in a 2014 exhibit entitled, "The Famous and the Forgotten: Revisiting Monhegan's Celebrated 1914 Art Exhibition."

Geography
Adjacent Manana Island helps form Monhegan Harbor.

Demographics

As of the census of 2000, there were 75 people, 46 households, and 21 families residing in the plantation. The racial makeup of the plantation was 97.33% White and 2.67% Asian.

There were 46 households, out of which 13.0% had children under the age of 18 living with them, 32.6% were married couples living together, 4.3% had a female householder with no husband present, and 54.3% were non-families. Of all households 47.8% were made up of individuals, and 4.3% had someone living alone who was 65 years of age or older. The average household size was 1.63 and the average family size was 2.24.

In the plantation the population was spread out, with 10.7% under the age of 18, 8.0% from 18 to 24, 29.3% from 25 to 44, 37.3% from 45 to 64, and 14.7% who were 65 years of age or older. The median age was 48 years. For every 100 females, there were 127.3 males. For every 100 females age 18 and over, there were 116.1 males.

The median income for a household in the plantation was $26,250, and the median income for a family was $53,125. Males had a median income of $36,563 versus $13,333 for females. The per capita income for the plantation was $20,568. There were 10.5% of families and 3.8% of the population living below the poverty line, including 10.0% of under eighteens and none of those over 64.

Sites of interest and outdoor activities

Summer months bring artists and tourists on several daily ferries. Visitors arrive at the ferry landing or on a beach in the village precinct. The village includes a church, private homes, hotels, art studios, private homes for rent and a few small stores, including one that sells fresh fish/lobster. Inland paths lead through woods, including the Cathedral Woods. A tradition of building miniature "fairy houses" from found materials in Cathedral Woods and other areas has brought controversy, guidance and even destruction of non-compliant constructions.

The hill above the village is the site of the Monhegan Island Light, which offers a view of the village, the harbor, Manana Island, and across the sea to the west.  Adjacent to the lighthouse is the Monhegan Museum, which is open middays from late June through September; the museum houses artifacts, reflecting the island's history.

The island is on the Atlantic flyway and is a stopover for migrating birds and the birdwatchers who come seasonally to observe them.

Monhegan's library was founded as the Jackie and Edward Library, named after two children who were lost to high waves on the island's shoreline, and specialized in children's literature. It became the Monhegan Memorial Library and broadened its literary selection.

Education
In 2005, the Monhegan Island School had seven students, ages five through 12 (kindergarten through eighth grade), all taught by a single teacher; high-school students must attend school on the mainland. The schoolhouse reportedly also serves as a community center, which is site of the annual Christmas play and community dinner.

Notable people
The following are people who have either resided on Monhegan or regularly visited the island:

 George Bellows, artist
 Abraham Bogdanove, artist
 Jon Bogdanove, comic book artist
 Kate Chappell, artist, entrepreneur
 Tom Chappell, entrepreneur
 Jay Hall Connaway, artist
 Lynne Drexler, artist
 Theodore Miller Edison, businessman
 Ernest Fiene, artist
 Sears Gallagher, artist
 Robert Henri, artist
 Edward Hopper, artist
 Wilson Irvine, artist
 Elena Jahn, artist 
 Rockwell Kent, artist
 Frances Kornbluth, artist
 Josh Mostel, actor
 Zero Mostel, actor
 Robert Mrazek, congressman from New York
 Remak Ramsay, actor
 Edward Redfield, artist
 Samoset, Abenaki sagamore
 Sonya Sklaroff, artist
 Frederick Judd Waugh, artist
 Andrew Winter, artist
 Andrew Wyeth, artist
 Jamie Wyeth, artist
 N.C. Wyeth, artist

Gallery

See also
 List of islands of Maine
 Rockwell Kent Cottage and Studio, also known as Kent-Fitzgerald Home

References

Further reading
 Trotter, Bill Monhegan Prepares for Wind Power Bangor Daily News, Oct. 28, 2010

External links

 Visitors' Guide
 WCVB profile, "Main Streets and Back Roads: Monhegan Island"
 The Influence (Monhegan, Maine)

Artist colonies
Plantations in Maine
Plantations in Lincoln County, Maine
Islands of Lincoln County, Maine
Car-free zones in the United States
National Natural Landmarks in Maine
Populated coastal places in Maine
Islands of Maine
Coastal islands of Maine